Since the creation of the first league in 1891, several official cups have been played in Argentina apart from the main competition, the Primera División championship. The first cup held in the country was the Copa de Honor Municipalidad de Buenos Aires; launched in 1905, it was played until 1920.

The Copa Campeonato, originally awarded to Primera División champion, is the oldest trophy of Argentine football for a current competition, having been established in 1896, three year after the Association was created, and played without interruption until 1926. The Cup received several names, such as "Championship Cup", "Copa Campeonato", "Challenge Cup" and "Copa Alumni", due to the association offered legendary team Alumni to keep the Cup definitely for having won it three consecutive times (1900–02), but the club from Belgrano declined the honour to keep the trophy under dispute.

On June, 2013, the association decided to put the trophy back into circulation with the creation of a new competition, named "Superfinal" that consisted in a single match between winners of Torneo Inicial and Torneo Final, played in a neutral venue.

Current cup competitions held in Argentina are Copa Argentina, Supercopa Argentina and the most recent, Copa de la Superliga and Trofeo de Campeones de la Superliga

List of Cups 
The following is a list with all the national cups held in Argentina until present days. Only competitions contested by Primera División clubs are listed.

Notes

Titles by club

Gallery

Other cups
Apart from the cups mentioned, there were other competitions such as Copa Bullrich (contested from 1903 to 1934 by teams of lower divisions) and Copa Presidente de la Nación (contested from representatives of regional leagues), originally organised by dissident Asociación Amateurs de Football (1920–26) and then continued by AFA from 1927 to 1989).

Because of not having been contested by Primera División clubs, these cups are not included in the list of national cups by the Argentine Association although they were official competitions.

Notes

References

External links
 Argentine Football Association
 Liga Profesional

C